Arthur Treadwell Walden (May 10, 1871 – March 26, 1947) was a Klondike Gold Rush adventurer, dog driver and participant in the first Byrd Antarctic Expedition. He is also known as an author and developer of the Chinook sled dog breed.

Early life
Arthur Treadwell Walden was born on May 10, 1871 in Indianapolis, Indiana to an Episcopal clergyman named Rev. Treadwell Walden and his wife, Elizabeth Leighton. Walden spent much of his youth in Minnesota and was educated at the Chattuck Military School in Faribault. In 1890 his father was appointed minister of St. Paul's Cathedral in Boston. Disliking city life in Boston, Arthur went to live at his father's vacation home in Tamworth, New Hampshire.

In Alaska and the Yukon
Restless and wanting adventure, Walden traveled to Alaska in March 1896. In August 1896 gold was discovered in the Klondike. During the gold rush, Walden found himself working as a freighter carrying supplies and mail down the Yukon River. He became experienced with sled dogs that were used to pull freight over vast distances. The use of sled dogs led to freighters being called "dog punchers"

Breeding the Chinook
After returning to New England, Walden married Katherine Sleeper on December 9, 1902 in Tamworth, New Hampshire. She was a relative of his stepmother and the daughter of a wealthy Boston newspaper family. The couple operated the 1300-acre Wonalancet Farm and Inn. Walden began training and breeding sled dogs at the farm. On January 17, 1917, a litter of three dogs was born that Walden had bred from a female Greenland Dog and a male Mastiff/St. Bernard mix farm dog. One of those dogs, Chinook, was the progenitor of the breed that bears his name. He named the dog after a favorite Eskimo dog he worked with in the Yukon. The breed would eventually be named the state dog of New Hampshire. In 1922, he convinced a local newspaper to sponsor the first 123-mile Eastern International Dog Derby, bringing the sport of dog sled racing to New England. Walden founded the New England Sled Dog Club in 1924. In 1928 Walden published his memoir, A Dog-Puncher in the Yukon.

Antarctic Expedition
In 1927, Richard Byrd selected Walden to run the dog teams during his first Antarctic Expedition. Walden would only agree to accompany Byrd if he guaranteed that no dogs would be shot to save supplies, as had been done in previous expeditions. A few members of the expedition spent the winter of 1927-1928 at the Walden farm training and testing trail gear. During the expedition, Walden and his 13 dogs moved thousands of pounds of supplies from the ship over the 16 mile trail to base camp. Chinook, the first dog of his breed, disappeared (presumably dying) on January 17, 1929 while moving supplies to base camp. Walden received the Congressional Medal for his efforts during the Antarctic Expedition in 1931.

Death
Walden died on March 26, 1947, while saving his wife from a fire in the kitchen of their farmhouse.

References

External links
Biography on Seppala Kennels website
Cowhampshire biography of Walden
Northern Light Media biography of Walden
Chinook Club of America history of the breed
Chinook Owner's Association history
History of the Chinook Dog
New England Historical Society biography of Walden

1871 births
1947 deaths
Dog breeders
American gold prospectors
Dog trainers
Explorers of Antarctica
American polar explorers
American autobiographers